Rose Building may refer to:

in the United States (by state):
 Rose Building (Fairbanks, Alaska), listed on the National Register of Historic Places (NRHP)
 Rose Building (Little Rock, Arkansas), NRHP-listed
 F. D. Rose Building, Muncie, Indiana, NRHP-listed in Delaware County
 Adolph Rose Building, Vicksburg, Mississippi, NRHP-listed in Warren County
 Rose Realty-Securities Building, Omaha, Nebraska, NRHP-listed
 Rose Building (Cleveland, Ohio)
 Visitors Information Center (Portland, Oregon), or the Rose Building